Sarah Ashley Moras (born 30 April 1988) is a Canadian mixed martial artist who competes in the Bantamweight division. Moras fought in the Ultimate Fighting Championship (UFC) and she was a contestant on The Ultimate Fighter: Team Rousey vs. Team Tate. Prior to joining the UFC, Moras fought in Invicta FC.

Mixed martial arts career

Early career
Moras made her professional MMA debut in May 2010.  Before appearing on The Ultimate Fighter, she amassed a record of three wins and one loss in the first two years of her career.

The Ultimate Fighter
In August 2015, it was announced that Moras was selected as a participant on The Ultimate Fighter: Team Rousey vs. Team Tate, the first coed version of the show. In the elimination bout, Moras defeated Tara LaRosa after 2 rounds via decision to get into the TUF house.  She then went on to defeat Peggy Morgan via submission in the first round to get into the semifinals. Sarah banked a 25K bonus for the TUF 18 Submission of the Season. In the semifinals, Moras lost to eventual winner Julianna Peña by submission in the second round.

Ultimate Fighting Championship
Moras made her official UFC debut against Alexis Dufresne on July 6, 2014, at The Ultimate Fighter 19 Finale. She won the fight via unanimous decision.

After a year away from the sport, Moras returned to face Jéssica Andrade at UFC Fight Night 71. She lost the fight by unanimous decision after almost submitting Andrade to a Hail Mary rear naked choke in the last minute of the last round.

Moras faced Ashlee Evans-Smith on September 9, 2017, at UFC 215. She won the fight via armbar submission, dislocating Evans-Smith's elbow in the first round.

Moras faced Lucie Pudilová on February 18, 2018, at UFC Fight Night: Cowboy vs. Medeiros. She lost the fight by unanimous decision.

Moras faced Talita Bernardo on October 27, 2018, at UFC Fight Night 138. She lost the fight via unanimous decision.

Moras was scheduled to face Leah Letson on May 4, 2019, at UFC Fight Night 151. However, Letson was removed from the fight in early April for an unspecified medical issue and replaced by Macy Chiasson. Moras lost the fight via TKO in the second round.

Moras faced Liana Jojua on September 7, 2019, at UFC 242. At the weigh-ins, Moras weighed in at 138 lbs, 2 pounds over the lightweight non-title fight limit of 136 lbs. She was fined 20% of her fight purse to Jojua, and the bout proceeded at catchweight. She won the fight via TKO in the third round.

Moras was scheduled to face Sijara Eubanks on April 18, 2020, at UFC 249. However, on April 9, Dana White, the president of UFC announced that this event was postponed and rescheduled to May 13, 2020, at UFC Fight Night: Smith vs. Teixeira. She lost the fight via unanimous decision.

Moras was scheduled to face Vanessa Melo on November 7, 2020, at UFC Fight Night 182. However, Moras tested positive for COVID-19 and the bout was postponed to take place at UFC on ABC: Holloway vs. Kattar on January 16, 2021. She lost the fight via unanimous decision.

On February 4, 2021, Moras was released from the UFC.

Mixed martial arts record

|-
|Loss
|align=center| 6–7
|Vanessa Melo
|Decision (unanimous)
|UFC on ABC: Holloway vs. Kattar 
|
|align=center|3
|align=center|5:00
|Abu Dhabi, United Arab Emirates
|
|-
|Loss
|align=center| 6–6
|Sijara Eubanks
|Decision (unanimous)
|UFC Fight Night: Smith vs. Teixeira
|
|align=center|3
|align=center|5:00
|Jacksonville, Florida, United States
|
|-
|Win
|align=center| 6–5
|Liana Jojua
|TKO (punches and elbows)
|UFC 242 
|
|align=center|3
|align=center|2:26
|Abu Dhabi, United Arab Emirates
|
|-
|Loss
|align=center| 5–5
|Macy Chiasson
|TKO (punches)
|UFC Fight Night: Iaquinta vs. Cowboy 
|
|align=center|2
|align=center|2:22
|Ottawa, Ontario, Canada
|
|-
|Loss
|align=center| 5–4
|Talita Bernardo
|Decision (unanimous)
|UFC Fight Night: Volkan vs. Smith 
|
|align=center|3
|align=center|5:00
|Moncton, New Brunswick, Canada
|
|-
|Loss
|align=center| 5–3
|Lucie Pudilová
|Decision (unanimous)
|UFC Fight Night: Cowboy vs. Medeiros 
|
|align=center|3
|align=center|5:00
|Austin, Texas, United States
|
|-
|Win
|align=center| 5–2
|Ashlee Evans-Smith
|Submission (armbar)
|UFC 215 
|
|align=center|1
|align=center|2:51
|Edmonton, Alberta, Canada
|
|-
| Loss
| align=center| 4–2
| Jéssica Andrade
| Decision (unanimous)
| UFC Fight Night: Mir vs. Duffee
| 
| align=center|3
| align=center|5:00
| San Diego, California, United States
| 
|-
| Win
| align=center| 4–1
| Alexis Dufresne
| Decision (unanimous)
| The Ultimate Fighter: Team Edgar vs. Team Penn Finale
| 
| align=center| 3
| align=center| 5:00
| Las Vegas, Nevada, United States
|
|-
| Win
| align=center| 3–1
| Christina Barry
| Technical Submission (armbar)
| AFC 11: Takeover
| 
| align=center| 1
| align=center| 1:33
| Winnipeg, Manitoba, Canada
|
|-
| Loss
| align=center| 2–1
| Raquel Pennington
| Decision (unanimous)
| Invicta FC 2: Baszler vs. McMann
| 
| align=center| 3
| align=center| 5:00
| Kansas City, Kansas, United States
| 
|-
| Win
| align=center| 2–0
| Julianna Peña
| TKO (doctor stoppage)
|Conquest of the Cage 11
| 
| align=center| 2
| align=center| 5:00
| Airway Heights, Washington, United States
| 
|-
| Win
| align=center| 1–0
| Helena Martin
| TKO (punches)
| Cage Warriors 37
| 
| align=center| 2
| align=center| 3:40
| Birmingham, England
| 
|-

Mixed martial arts exhibition record

|-
|Loss
|align=center|2–1
|Julianna Peña
|Submission (guillotine choke) 
|rowspan=3|The Ultimate Fighter: Team Rousey vs. Team Tate
| (air date)
|align=center|2
|align=center|3:31
|rowspan=3|Las Vegas, Nevada, United States
|
|-
|Win
|align=center|2–0
|Peggy Morgan
|Submission (armbar) 
| (air date)
|align=center|1
|align=center|4:39
|
|-
|Win
|align=center|1–0
|Tara LaRosa
|Decision (unanimous) 
| (air date)
|align=center|2
|align=center|5:00
|

References

External links
 
 

1988 births
Sportspeople from British Columbia
Living people
Canadian female mixed martial artists
Bantamweight mixed martial artists
Mixed martial artists utilizing Brazilian jiu-jitsu
Canadian practitioners of Brazilian jiu-jitsu
Female Brazilian jiu-jitsu practitioners
Ultimate Fighting Championship female fighters
Canadian people of Croatian descent